On October 21, 2021, at the Bonanza Creek Ranch in Bonanza City, New Mexico, cinematographer Halyna Hutchins was fatally shot and director Joel Souza was injured on the set of the film Rust when a live round was discharged from a revolver used as a prop by actor Alec Baldwin.

The incident has been extensively investigated by the Santa Fe County Sheriff's Office, the New Mexico First Judicial District Attorney, the New Mexico Occupational Health and Safety Bureau, and the Federal Bureau of Investigation. On January 19, 2023, the Santa Fe district attorney announced that Baldwin and armorer Hannah Gutierrez-Reed would be charged with two counts each of involuntary manslaughter, and in the alternative with two counts each of manslaughter. First assistant director David Halls agreed to plead guilty to the charge of the negligent use of a deadly weapon. On January 31, 2023, Baldwin was criminally charged with two counts of involuntary manslaughter. On February 23, 2023, Baldwin pled not guilty.

Production of Rust was suspended. The incident prompted discourse on occupational safety in the film industry, the treatment of its employees, and the use of real guns as props.

Background

Writer and director Joel Souza conceived the story for Rust with actor and producer Alec Baldwin. The Western film was produced on a small budget of $6–7 million and was Baldwin's passion project. Its distribution rights were sold for $2 million during the pre-production phase. The production had a filming schedule of 21 days. Filming began on October 6, 2021, at the Bonanza Creek Ranch in Bonanza City, New Mexico, a ghost town located thirteen miles south of Santa Fe.

Responsible for overseeing all weapons on set was the production's property key assistant and armorer, Hannah Gutierrez-Reed, daughter of long-time industry armorer Thell Reed. Rust was Gutierrez-Reed's second film serving as lead armorer. On her first film, The Old Way, several crew members complained about her handling of firearms, including an incident in which she discharged a weapon without warning and caused lead actor Nicolas Cage to walk off set.

David Halls was the assistant director. In the aftermath of the incident, former colleagues reported that Halls faced complaints in 2019 about his behavior on two episodes of Into the Dark, in which he disregarded safety protocols by ignoring blocked exits and a fire lane. In the same year, Halls had been fired from working on the film Freedom's Path after a firearm discharged unexpectedly on set, wounding a crew member.

On the set of the independent film One Way, a crew member warned producers about Halls's disregard for safety measures and said, "That man is a liability. He's going to fucking kill someone someday, and you're going to be responsible." However, the film's digital imaging technician disputes this claim, saying he knew Halls to be conscientious about safety. The Hollywood Reporter reported a number of complaints raised during the production of 2019's The Tiger Rising, which also featured Rust executive producers Ryan Donnell Smith, Allen Cheney, Emily Hunter Salveson, and Ryan Winterstern.

Safety complaints and walkout
The beginning of Rusts production came amidst a potential strike by members of the International Alliance of Theatrical Stage Employees (IATSE) over working conditions and low pay. On October 4, it was announced that IATSE members voted 98.68% in favor of authorizing a strike, with a voter turnout of 89.66% of eligible voters. Cinematographer Halyna Hutchins supported the IATSE. She wrote in an Instagram post: "Standing in #IAsolidarity with our @IATSE crew here in New Mexico on RUST."

Some crew members claim firearms safety protocols were not distributed with the call sheets and were not strictly followed on the set. They claim a medic was absent during the construction of the film's sets. Furthermore, crew members grew upset with what they claimed was a lack of adequate hotel rooms. Crew members alleged producers would only allow the local New Mexico crew courtesy room rentals after working 13 hours "on the clock". Some claimed they were only left with six hours to sleep after long drives home. However, a source close to the production said their union contract indicated a hotel would be provided if the travel distance was more than 60 miles and that producers would provide a hotel for crew after 13.5 hours or more on set. The source also claimed that hotels were provided to crew on days they worked 10–12 hours if call time was before 6 a.m. and production wrapped after 7 p.m.

It has been reported that some crew members believe they were mocked for wanting to avoid a one-hour drive from Albuquerque. Several crew members also cited that they were not being paid on time. A crew member added, "We cited everything from lack of payment for three weeks, taking our hotels away despite asking for them in our deals, lack of COVID safety, and on top of that, poor gun safety! Poor on-set safety period!"  Before the incident occurred, two prop guns had previously fired a total of three times unintentionally (Baldwin's stunt double had accidentally fired two blanks when he was told a prop gun was "cold", and the film's prop master shot herself in the foot with a blank round).

In a letter signed by 24 crew members, these claims were disputed. In the letter, the crew writes that they "believe the public narrative surrounding our workplace tragedy to be inadequate and wish to express a more accurate account of our experience. We do acknowledge that no set is perfect, and like any production, Rust had areas of brilliance and areas that were more challenged," read the joint statement. "While we stand firmly with our unions and strongly support the fight for better working conditions across our industry, we do not feel that this set was a representation of the kind of conditions our unions are fighting against." The open letter claims that the shoot was not "a chaotic, dangerous, and exploitative workplace". They go on to write that "[u]nfortunately, in the film industry, it is common to work on unprofessional or hectic productions to gain experience and credits. Many of us have worked on those types of productions. Rust was not one of them. Rust was professional."

On October 21, seven unionized members of the film's camera crew collected their belongings at approximately 6:30a.m. MT in a walkout. They claim they were told to leave the set, with a producer threatening to call the police, and were replaced. According to a statement given to TheWrap by an anonymous insider, several crew members took a number of prop guns off-set that day, including the firearm involved in the incident, to pass the time shooting at beer cans with live ammunition. After a lunch break, the prop guns had been returned. It is not clear if the firearms were checked again. On October 26, the Santa Fe County district attorney said these claims were still unconfirmed.

Events

Preparations for the rehearsal
On the twelfth day of filming, on October 21, 2021, the cast and crew were rehearsing a gunfight scene taking place inside of a church at the Bonanza Creek Ranch. Firearms and ammunition were retrieved from a locked safe and Gutierrez-Reed placed three guns used as props on a cart. Among them were a plastic gun that could not shoot live ammunition, a modified weapon that could not fire any type of ammunition, and a solid-frame .45 Colt revolver replica made by Pietta. The last was the one that Baldwin fired. That morning a new box of ammunition arrived from an uncertain source.

There are conflicting accounts of how Baldwin came into possession of the revolver. According to a search warrant, the guns were briefly checked by armorer Gutierrez-Reed, before assistant director Halls took the weapon from the prop cart and handed it to Baldwin. In a subsequent affidavit, Halls said the safety protocol regarding this firearm was such that Halls would open the loading gate of the revolver and rotate the cylinder to expose the chambers so he could inspect them himself. According to the affidavit, Halls did not check all cylinder chambers; he recalled seeing three rounds at the time, while the gun was loaded with at least four, one of which was a live round. He "couldn't recall if she [Gutierrez-Reed] spun the drum." In the warrant, it is further stated that Halls announced the term "cold gun", meaning that it was empty. Halls's lawyer, Lisa Torraco, insisted that he did not grab the gun off the table and hand it to Baldwin as reported.

Rehearsal and shooting incident
B-camera operator Reid Russell was situated on a camera dolly, looking at a monitor with Hutchins and Souza both nearby. The scene involved Baldwin's character removing a gun from its holster and pointing it toward the camera. The trio behind the monitor were two feet from the muzzle of the firearm and none of them were wearing any protective gear like noise-canceling headphones or safety goggles.

While the trio behind the monitor were repositioning the camera to remove a shadow, Baldwin began explaining to the crew how he planned to draw the firearm. He said, "So, I guess I'm gonna take this out, pull it, and go, 'Bang!'" When he removed it from the holster, the gun was fired a single time. Baldwin and Halls have said that Baldwin did not pull the trigger, a claim that was later challenged by an FBI report. The projectile flew towards the three behind the monitor, striking Hutchins in the chest and Souza in the shoulder. Script supervisor Mamie Mitchell called 9-1-1 at 1:46p.m. PT and emergency crews appeared three minutes later. Footage of the incident was not recorded.

Hutchins was flown by helicopter to the University of New Mexico Hospital in Albuquerque, where she was pronounced dead. Souza was treated by EMS and transported by ambulance to Christus St. Vincent Regional Medical Center in Santa Fe, where he was admitted and released by the following morning.

As a result of the incident, production on Rust was suspended indefinitely, though co-producer Anjul Nigam was confident the film would resume production once the investigation ends. However, Nigam later clarified that he meant to express optimism and hope, rather than confidence, as he stated that many involved in the production hope to honor Hutchins by completing her final work.

Criminal charges

Investigation 
On October 21, the Santa Fe County Sheriff's Office said it was investigating "what type of projectile was discharged" and how the event occurred. Baldwin was questioned and left without charges filed.

On October 22, Baldwin sent out a tweet expressing his shock and sadness. He also indicated his full cooperation in the ongoing police investigation regarding the incident, which the Sheriff's Office confirmed. On October 22, the Santa Fe County Magistrate issued two search warrants. In an affidavit, the Sheriff's Office said neither Halls nor Baldwin knew the gun was loaded. On October 27, after issuing another search warrant, the department said they had recovered over 600 items as evidence, including 500 rounds of ammunition which were a mix of blanks, dummy rounds and suspected live rounds. They added that a projectile had been recovered from Souza's shoulder, which they categorized as a suspected live round.

The incident is also under investigation by the state's First Judicial District Attorney, as well as the New Mexico Occupational Health and Safety Bureau, and the Federal Bureau of Investigation. The film's production company, Rust Movie Productions, is conducting an internal review. On October 26, the film's producers said they had hired a legal team from Jenner & Block to conduct an investigation and interview the cast and crew about the incident. On the same day, women's rights attorney Gloria Allred and her law firm Allred, Maroko & Goldberg were confirmed to be investigating the incident and representing Rust script supervisor Mamie Mitchell. On October 28, Halls hired Albuquerque attorney Lisa Torraco as his defense lawyer; Gutierrez-Reed hired former Assistant U.S. Attorney Jason Bowles as her lawyer.

On November 3, Bowles made the claim that sabotage was involved in the incident. On November 10, Santa Fe County District Attorney Mary Carmack-Altwies said there was no evidence to back up Bowles's claim and added, "The defense attorneys, we don't have the same information that they do, but until we have it in our hands, it doesn't play into the decision making process." That same day, Bowles continued to spread his theory and said his team "are convinced that this was sabotage and Hannah is being framed." In December 2021, Gutierrez-Reed's father Thell Reed said there was "a lot of motive" for the incident to be sabotage.

On December 2, 2021, an interview between Baldwin and television host George Stephanopoulos aired on ABC. On December 6, Baldwin deleted his Twitter account. On December 16, it was reported that Santa Fe police had obtained a search warrant for Baldwin's mobile phone, which was handed over on January 14, 2022.

In August 2022, FBI forensic testing and investigation of the firearm determined the Pietta .45 Long Colt Single Action Army revolver could not have been fired without a trigger pull from a quarter cocked, half-cocked, or fully cocked hammer position. It was also determined that the internal components of the revolver were intact and functional which ruled out mechanical failure as a reason for an accidental discharge. Baldwin stated during a December 2021 interview for ABC News that "the trigger wasn't pulled" and "I didn't pull the trigger."

Prosecution 
On April 21, 2022, the state of New Mexico fined the production company, Rust Movie Productions, $137,000 for ignoring firearms safety regulations, revealing that Gutierrez-Reed's time as armorer was extremely limited, Halls had witnessed two other misfires and did nothing about safety issues, along with giving Baldwin the weapon that killed Hutchins, and stating the production company failed to have a process for preventing live ammunition from getting onto the set.

On January 19, 2023, New Mexico First Judicial District Attorney Mary Carmack-Altwies said she will charge Baldwin and Gutierrez-Reed with two counts each of involuntary manslaughter. Halls agreed to plead guilty to negligent use of a deadly weapon, and received a suspended sentence and six months of probation.

Carmack-Altwies has hired Andrea Reeb as a special prosecutor for the case. Carmack-Altwies said that she will be handling the case in conjunction with Reeb.

On January 31, 2023, Alec Baldwin and Hannah Gutierrez-Reed were officially charged with involuntary manslaughter for the fatal shooting; if found guilty, the pair could have been sentenced to five years in prison. One of his attorneys is John Bash. However, after Baldwin's lawyers argued that he was incorrectly being charged under a version of the law that was not passed until months after the shooting, the prosecutors downgraded the charges. Baldwin and Gutierrez-Reed now face a maximum of 18 months in prison if found guilty. On February 23, Baldwin pled not guilty. It was also reported that he could still work, but also accepted pre-trial conditions which include a prohibition on consuming alcohol and not having possession of weapons, including firearms.

Civil lawsuits 
On November 10, Rust gaffer Serge Svetnoy filed a lawsuit against the production for general negligence. A second lawsuit was filed on November 17 by script supervisor Mamie Mitchell, who says the script did not call for the discharging of a firearm. On January 23, 2022, Baldwin and other producers filed a memorandum that asked a California judge to dismiss the November 17, 2021 lawsuit by Mitchell. In November 2022, the court rejected a request to dismiss Mitchell's lawsuit against Baldwin and his production company.

On January 12, 2022, Gutierrez-Reed filed a lawsuit against armorer Seth Kenney and his company PDQ Arm and Prop for allegedly bringing the live rounds on set. On February 7, 2022, Rust key medic Cheryln Schaefer filed a lawsuit against the production and several crew members for negligence. On February 15, after nearly three months of legal preparation, the Hutchins family filed a wrongful death suit which named Baldwin, Halls, Gutierrez-Reed, prop master Sarah Zachry, and others as defendants and sought unspecified damages. In October 2022, the Hutchins family settled the lawsuit. Filming was set to resume in January 2023, in California, with Matthew Hutchins as an executive producer. Many of the film's crew gave mixed reactions towards the news, with some supporting it and planning on resuming their work on it, while others condemned the decision and decided to not return.

To get the permit to film, New Mexico requires at least a $1 million insurance policy. The production company had that in addition to a commercial umbrella policy for another $5 million, issued by Front Row Insurance Brokers. However, the insurance company may not pay if the accident is shown to be due to negligence and/or if there were certain exclusions in the insurance policy.

Reactions 
The International Cinematographers Guild announced it would hold a candlelight vigil on the evenings of October 23 and 24 for Hutchins. The Guild additionally set up a GoFundMe fundraiser for Hutchins's family. The American Film Institute (AFI) announced that it would set up a scholarship program for women cinematographers in Hutchins's name. On October 24, a vigil took place in New Mexico to mourn Hutchins's death. Industry professionals, including a number of Hollywood actors, were among those who attended the event in Albuquerque. Some attendees also called for better safety measures to be taken on film sets.

On October 29, Gutierrez-Reed released a statement saying that "the whole production set became unsafe" due to several factors that included a lack of safety meetings and her having to work two positions, preventing her from focusing full-time on her position as armorer. The statement also said that she "fought for training, days to maintain weapons, and proper time to prepare for gunfire but ultimately was overruled by production and her department", and that she had no idea where the live rounds came from. On November 1, Halls released a statement to the New York Post in which he paid his respects to Hutchins and said he hoped the incident would cause "the industry to reevaluate its values and practices to ensure no one is harmed through the creative process again".

Prop gun debate 
The shooting sparked debates about the use of guns as props on film sets. Shannon Lee, the sister of Brandon Lee, an actor who was killed by a similar accidental shooting from a prop firearm on the film set of The Crow in 1993, called for mandatory gun safety training and reducing the use of firearms as props, stating that "with all the special effects that are possible and all of the technology, there is no reason to have a prop gun or a gun on a set that can fire a projectile of any sort". Similar comments were echoed by others who knew Lee or had worked with him on The Crow. Bill Dill, a cinematographer who was a teacher for Hutchins at the AFI, also suggested using special effects instead, calling it "archaic" that "real guns with blanks in them" are used in film. On October 22, The Rookie showrunner Alexi Hawley announced that the show would ban live guns from set, stating that "it is now policy on The Rookie that all gunfire on set will be Airsoft guns with CGI muzzle flashes added in post."

Firearms safety expert Dave Brown disputes the need to use only fake or toy guns in future film productions. In an article for CNN, he says that incidents such as this one "are the result not of including firearms on a film set but of a cavalier attitude towards safety" and "[w]hen handled responsibly, firearms are as safe as any other prop on a film set." He explains that, "On a safe production, each firearm is meticulously inspected every time it changes hands. It means every take of every angle of every scene; the same prop gun could be checked and re-checked dozens upon dozens of times in a single day. Live ammunition, without question, is never allowed on set."

The shooting sparked debates about the use of guns in films and television more generally. In an article for The Conversation, Brad Bushman of Ohio State University and Dan Romer of the University of Pennsylvania argued that "the gun industry pays production companies to place its products in their movies. They are rewarded with frequent appearances on screen," and that "the more guns there are in movies, the more likely it is that a shooting will occur – both in the 'reel' world and in the 'real' world." An editorial for the Los Angeles Times said the incident "raises the bigger issue of the proliferation of guns in shows and movies. Weapons are often part of plot points but do they need to be? TV and movie cops brandish and fire their weapons often, but in reality, a police officer rarely draws his or her gun (outside of a shooting range) in the course of an entire career."

Occupational safety criticism 
The shooting also sparked debates about working conditions on film sets. In a speech at a vigil, IATSE vice-president Michael Miller said, "I'm afraid we are also gathered with some frustration and a little bit of anger. Anger that too often the rush to complete productions and the cutting of corners puts safety on the back burner and puts crew members at risk." In a Facebook post, the gaffer on the film set, Serge Svetnoy, said that "to save a dime sometimes [producers] hire people who are not fully qualified for the complicated and dangerous job."

See also 
 List of film and television accidents
 The Captive, a 1915 film that used live ammunition during filming, resulting in the accidental shooting death of an extra
 Twilight Zone accident, a 1982 film-set incident that caused the death of Vic Morrow and two child actors
 Death of Jon-Erik Hexum, a 1984 accident with a gun being used as a prop during the filming of Cover Up, involving a self-inflicted blank cartridge gunshot to the head
 Death of Brandon Lee, a 1993 accident with a gun being used as a prop during the filming of The Crow, involving a propelled squib load
 Safety for Sarah movement, a campaign created after camera assistant Sarah Jones was struck and killed by a train during filming of Midnight Rider in 2014.

References 

2021 controversies
2021 controversies in the United States
2021 in American cinema
2021 in New Mexico
Accidental deaths in New Mexico
Deaths by firearm in New Mexico
Film controversies
Film controversies in the United States
Occupational safety and health
October 2021 events in the United States
Stagecraft